Barberton Airport  is an airport serving Barberton and surrounding areas in Mpumalanga province in South Africa.

Runway: 17/35 grass surface measuring 1,000 by 15 metres (3,300 × 49 ft). Runway lights

See also
 List of airports in South Africa

References

Airports in South Africa
Buildings and structures in Mpumalanga
Transport in Mpumalanga
Mbombela